Persemalra Maluku Tenggara also known as Persemalra Langgur (full name: Persatuan Sepakbola Maluku Tenggara) is an Indonesian football club based in Langgur, Southeast Maluku Regency, Maluku. They currently compete in the Liga 3 and play their home matches at the Maren Stadium with a capacity of 6–7 thousand seats.

History
Persemalra Maluku Tenggara founded 14 June 1982. Owner of Persemalra Maluku Tenggara is Southeast Maluku Regency Government.

Crest

Players

Notable former players
  Rahel Tuasalamony
  Hendra Bayauw

Honours
 2005 = Champion Zona Maluku
 2005 = Champion Division III
 2006 = Champion Division II
 2007 = Champion Division I
 2009/10 = Runner Up Division I Promotion to Premier Division
 2010/11 = 9th Premier Division

References

External links
 Persemalra Maluku Tenggara at Liga-Indonesia.co.id

 
Football clubs in Indonesia
Football clubs in Maluku (province)
Association football clubs established in 1982
1982 establishments in Indonesia